Al-Faisaly Sports Club is a professional football club based in Amman, Jordan, that competes in the Jordanian Pro League, the top flight of Jordanian football. Nicknamed "the Blue Eagles", they were founded as Al-Ashbal Club in 1932.

They are considered the most successful football club in the country and one of the most successful in the region, having won 83 official titles, 35 league titles, 21 Jordan FA Cups and 17 Jordan Super Cups, being the record holder for all these competitions, eight Jordan FA Shields and two AFC Cups.

Their main rival is Al-Wehdat, a club formed by a Palestinian refugee camp in Amman which is also one of the best clubs in the country.

History

Foundation and first years
The club was founded in 1932 under the name Al-Ashbal Club. Football was not the only sport they played: they also played handball, basketball, volleyball, boxing, and swimming. However, because of a lack of financial resources, they focused on the most popular sport in Jordan which is football.

As the club was gathering peoples of Jordan through which many activities that stand in the face of British colonialism in defense of the country, the British colonialism close club after they accused them that they are making a disturbance, preventing young people from exercising their right to express their rejection of this colonialism.

In 1941, Al-Faisaly restarted, but they realized that they need a large budget. They decided to issue a charity lottery and set up a committee to meet with the Jordanian army chief John Bagot Glubb to obtain official approval to sell the lottery tickets to Jordanian army units who were enthusiastic about the national direction of the club and agreed to them. The cultural committee, which was later headed by Mr. Ahmad Al-Tarawneh and the membership of lawyer Subhi Al-Qutb and Mamdouh Al-Sarayra, was active in distributing the Lottery, which resulted in the collection of 3,700 Jordanian dinars at the time, and this amount was enough to get a piece of land next to the Islamic Scientific College "currently" in Jabal Amman near "first" circle and "rainbow" street, and intend to rebuild the club and to raise the declaration again, they had what they wanted The club returned under the name of Al-Faisaly this time.

Colours
Al-Faisaly's home kit is all sky blue shirts and white shorts, while their away kit is all white shirts and black shorts.

Stadium
Al-Faisaly plays their home games at Amman International Stadium in Amman. The stadium was built in 1964 and opened in 1968, it is owned by The Jordanian government and operated by The higher council of youth. It is also the home stadium of Jordan national football team and Al-Jazeera. It has a current capacity of 17,619 spectators.

Support 
The heads of the Al-Faisaly fan club (ultras) are currently Mazin Al-Binni and Khaled Al-Zarqawi.

Rivalries 
Riots have repeatedly broken out for the past years between supporters and fans of Jordan's top rival clubs Al-Faisaly and Al-Wehdat, which is also a Palestinian refugee camp in Amman. The riots are regarded as reflecting tensions between the Palestinian fans of Al-Wehdat and the Jordanian fans of Al-Faisaly.

The Derby of Jordan is a football traditional game which combines clubs Al-Faisaly and Al-Wehdat and these games received great interest among the sports community on the domestic and Arab level to afford the sensitivities and long history between the two teams with meetings since 28 November 1976.

Players

Former players

Captains

Coaching staff

Managerial history

Presidential history 
The management of the club from 1970 to 2021 has always been run by Al-Odwan family.

Honours
The club holds 83 official titles.

Domestic (81 titles) 

 shared record

Continental (2 titles)

Regional

Asian record

AFC competitions

UAFA competitions

Arab Club Champions Cup / Arab Champions League: 12 appearances
1986: Preliminary round
1987: Preliminary round
1992: Semi-finals
2000: Semi-finals
2001: Group stage
2003: Group stage
2003–04: Group stage
2004–05: Group stage
2006–07: Runner-up
2007–08: Semi-finals
2008–09: Quarter-finals
2017: Runner-up
Arab Cup Winners' Cup: 5 appearances
1993: Group stage
1994: Group stage
1995: Group stage
1996: Runner-up
1999: Semi-finals
Arab Super Cup: 2 appearances
1997: Third place
2000: Runner-up

References

External links

 

 
Sport in Amman
Football clubs in Jordan
Football clubs in Amman
Association football clubs established in 1932
1932 establishments in Transjordan
AFC Cup winning clubs